Estefanía Torres Martínez (born 1982) is a Spanish politician. She served as Member of the European Parliament between 2015 and 2019.

Biography 
Born on 27 April 1982 in Cudillero, Asturias.

A candidate of Podemos at the 2014 European Parliament election in Spain, she became a member of the European Parliament on 25 March 2015, covering the vacant seat left by Pablo Echenique. She served as member of the Committee on the Environment, Public Health and Food Safety and the Delegation for Relations with the People's Republic of China

References

Living people
1982 births
MEPs for Spain 2014–2019
Podemos (Spanish political party) MEPs
Politicians from Asturias
People from Avilés (comarca)